Sahara Airlines was an airline company in. It operated domestic flights in Algeria between 1999 and 2003.

Service
Sahara Airlines operated flights to many destinations in Algeria: Adrar, Algiers, Bechar, Batna, Ghardaia, Tindouf, Annaba, Oran, Constantine, Hassi messaoud, Tamanrasset, Ouargla.

Code data
IATA Code: 6S
ICAO Code: SHD

History
Sahara airlines company was founded in 1998 and started its flights in September 1999 with air hostess and stewardess trained by the company.

Fleet
 5 Fairchild Hiller FH-227

See also		
 List of defunct airlines of Algeria

References

1998 establishments in Algeria
2003 disestablishments in Algeria
Defunct airlines of Algeria
Airlines established in 1998
Airlines disestablished in 2003